Agelenopsis naevia is a species of funnel weaver in the family Agelenidae. It is found in the United States and Canada.

References

Further reading

 
 
 

Agelenidae
Spiders described in 1841